The Lorin District (also known as the Lorin Streetcar District) is a neighborhood located in the southern part of Berkeley, California, bounded by Ashby Avenue to the north, Adeline Street and Martin Luther King Jr. Way to the east, Sacramento Street to the west, and 62nd Street to the south.

It was formerly the unincorporated town or settlement of Lorin, the last stop before Berkeley along the Berkeley Branch line of the Central Pacific (later, Southern Pacific).  In 1892, the people of Lorin elected to be annexed to the City of Berkeley.  Today, the area is today mostly referred to as "South Berkeley".

Lorin is the setting for a scene in former University of California student Frank Norris' book The Octopus (1903).

Notes

Neighborhoods in Berkeley, California
Streetcar suburbs